Lamar V. McGriggs (born May 9, 1968 in Chicago, Illinois) is a former National Football League and Canadian Football League linebacker, having last played for the Winnipeg Blue Bombers.

On February 22, 2006, McGriggs became a free agent after the Bombers declined their option on him. He won a Grey Cup championship in 1999 with the Hamilton Tiger-Cats.

McGriggs attended Thornton Township High School, Ellsworth Community College and Western Illinois University.

References

1968 births
Living people
American players of Canadian football
Canadian football linebackers
Hamilton Tiger-Cats players
New York Giants players
Ottawa Rough Riders players
Players of American football from Chicago
Players of Canadian football from Chicago
Saskatchewan Roughriders players
Western Illinois Leathernecks football players
Winnipeg Blue Bombers players